Saint Sava Serbian Orthodox Church (Serbian: Српска православна црква Светог Саве) is a Serbian Orthodox church located in the Cabbagetown neighbourhood of Toronto, Ontario, Canada.

It is dedicated to Saint Sava, the first Archbishop of the Serbian Orthodox Church. It is the first Serbian Orthodox church built in Toronto and is commonly referred to as the mother church.

History
Bishop (now Saint) Nikolaj Velimirović blessed the Church Hall on September 5, 1954.

The church was completed and consecrated on May 22, 1955, by Bishop Dionisije Milivojević. Princess Olga (sister of Russian Emperor Nicholas II) attended the celebration and banquet, donating an icon of St. Alexander Nevski made by her own hand.

In May 2016, a car crashed into the church.

See also
 Serbian Canadians
 Serbian Orthodox Eparchy of Canada
 Holy Transfiguration Monastery
 Saint Nicholas Serbian Orthodox Cathedral (Hamilton, Ontario)
 All Serbian Saints Serbian Orthodox Church (Mississauga)
 Saint Petka Serbian Orthodox Church
 Holy Trinity Serbian Orthodox Church (Montreal)
 Saint Arsenije Sremac Serbian Orthodox Church
 Holy Trinity Serbian Orthodox Church (Regina)
 Saint Michael the Archangel Serbian Orthodox Church (Toronto)
 St. Stefan Serbian Orthodox Church (Ottawa)

References

External links
 

Churches in Toronto
Serbian Orthodox church buildings in Canada
Eastern Orthodox church buildings in Canada
Church buildings with domes
Serbian-Canadian culture
Saint Sava